I Love Desi is a Hindi romantic comedy film directed by Pankaj Batra. Producer Rocky Daswani introduced Vedant Bali who is manager to Akshay Kumar and Priyanka Shah. Gulshan Grover, Mannat Singh, Shakti Anand, Krip Suri and Gurpreet Ghuggi are also starring in the film. The film has been shot in Canada, Thailand and India. Filmstar Akshay Kumar has helped his manager during the making of the film. I Love Desi released on 29 May 2015.

Cast
 Vedant Bali as Punjab Singh
 Priyanka Shah as Simran 
 Gulshan Grover as Bauji
 Shakti Anand as Punjab's Brother
 Mannat Singh as Bhabhi
 Krip Suri as Pumma
 Karaan Singh as Jimmy
 Gurpreet Ghuggi as Punjab's Friend
 Arun Bali as Simran's Father
 Sunita Dheer as Punjab's Mother

Plot synopsis
This is a love story, of an urban girl who, marries an Indian man with a rural background, just to inherit her ancestral property, conditioned to this requirement. Before untying this relation forever, as she had planned, she agrees to live for 6 months with her To-be forlorn husband, and gradually falls in love with him.

Soundtracks 
Music is given by Sham Balkar and Toshi Sabri – Sharib Sabri. One song is sung by Rahat Fateh Ali Khan, which was recorded in Dubai as he has not come to India since 2011. As the music director Sham Balkar was keen to get this song sung by Rahat Fateh Ali Khan.

References

External links
 
 

2010s Hindi-language films
2015 films
Indian romantic comedy films
Films shot in Canada
2015 romantic comedy films